Tom Welch is an American politician. He serves as a Republican member of the Montana House of Representatives, where he represents District 72, including Dillon, Montana.

References

Living people
People from Dillon, Montana
Republican Party members of the Montana House of Representatives
Year of birth missing (living people)
21st-century American politicians